Aliabad (also Romanized as ‘Alīābād) is a village in Bandan Rural District, in the Central District of Nehbandan County, South Khorasan Province, Iran. At the 2006 census, its population was 72, in 11 families.

References 

Populated places in Nehbandan County